Dobrošte (Macedonian: Доброште) is a village situated in the northeastern side of Tetovo, North Macedonia, within the 15-km of road along the Tetovo - Globocica highway. Under the new territorial division, Dobroste was moved from the Tetovo municipality to the new municipality of Tearce.

History
In 1453, Dobroste consisted of 48 families according to Turkish-Ottoman data. 15 years later, the village consisted of 90 families. Prior to Ottoman rule, the population of Dobrošte consisted of Albanian Catholics, as there were 4 Albanian Catholic churches in the village in addition to Christian graves with Albanian inscriptions. Due to Ottoman influence, most of the Albanians converted to Islam. In World War II, 71 people were killed by the Yugoslav Partisans.

Albanian nationalism
Dobroste was the birthplace of many Albanian nationalists. In 1917, Isen Hasani and Kadri Azemi fought against the Serbian Army in Skopska Crna Gora where they were eventually killed. From 1940 to 1945, Dobroste was headquarters of one of the Balli Kombetar units in the northwest of Macedonia. The most notable of these Ballists were Isen Rustemi and Halil Ivaja, as well as Ramadan Ramadani, Mete Azizi, Brahim Halimi, Llokman Lutfiu and Hafez Jusuf Azemi

Geography 
Coordinates: 42 ° 6 '12N, 21 ° 4' 40E,
Height (m): 494 meter m.n.d.
Population: Approximately 3,549

Demographics
As of the 2021 census, Dobrošte had 2,649 residents with the following ethnic composition:
Albanians 2,308
Macedonians 288
Persons for whom data are taken from administrative sources 40
Others 13

According to the 2002 census, the village had a total of 3,549 inhabitants. Ethnic groups in the village include:

Albanians 3,160
Macedonians 345
Serbs 3
Turks 2
Bosniaks 1
Others 38

Notable people
Hafëz Jusuf Azemi

References

Villages in Tearce Municipality
Albanian communities in North Macedonia